Sabína Kupčová (born 28 February 2003) is a Slovak swimmer. She competed in the women's 400 metre freestyle event at the 2018 FINA World Swimming Championships (25 m), in Hangzhou, China and also in the 200 metre freestyle and 4 x 100 metre freestyle relay events of the 2021 FINA World Swimming Championships (25 m) in Abu Dhabi without reaching the finals.

References

2003 births
Living people
Slovak female swimmers
Slovak female freestyle swimmers
Place of birth missing (living people)
21st-century Slovak women